Do vetra (To the Wind) is the fourth studio album by Slovak vocalist Szidi Tobias released on Studio DVA in 2010.

Track listing

Credits and personnel

 Szidi Tobias - lead vocal
 Milan Vyskočáni - music
 Peter Lipovský - lyrics
 Michal Horáček - lyrics
 Sándor Petőfi - lyrics

 Lope de Vega - lyrics
 Michal Hrubý - producer
 Lucie Robinson - photography
 Jozef Dobrík/Pestro - design
 TV Nova - sponsor

Charts

References

General

Specific

External links 
SzidiTobias.cz > Discography > Do vetra

2010 albums
Szidi Tobias albums